Flight strip may refer to:

Airfield
Flight progress strip